Libertopia was an annual libertarian festival/conference held in San Diego. It was organized by the Libertalia Foundation, a 501(c)(3) tax-exempt nonprofit organization, "dedicated to spreading the principles of free-market economics and voluntaryism".  The festival particularly attracted those interested in "small-government": minarchists, voluntaryists, agorists, and anarchists. The events included speeches, films, music, and an awards banquet where two individuals are presented "The Sovereign Awards for Lifetime Achievement" for their contributions towards the advancement of individuality and voluntaryism. The event was most recently held in 2018, but has not been held since.

Past gatherings and masters of ceremonies included:
 2010 (Oct 15–17) – Richard B. Boddie, Richard Stein (evening)
 2011 (Oct 21–23) – Stefan Molyneux
 2012 (Oct 11–14) – Stefan Molyneux
 2013 (Aug 28–Sep 2) – Jeffrey Tucker
 2014  (Nov 13–Nov 16) – Jeffrey Tucker

References

External links 
 

Festivals in San Diego
Libertarian organizations based in the United States